The Gmelin-Beilstein Medal is a prize of the German Chemical Society for scientists and scholars who have made an outstanding contribution to the history of chemistry, chemistry literature or chemical information. It is awarded with a silver medal and 7,500 euros in prize money and was first awarded in 1954 and donated by Hoechst AG. It is named after Leopold Gmelin and Friedrich Konrad Beilstein, who were known for their colossal handbooks.

Awarded 
 1954 Paul Walden, Maximilian Pflücke
 1956 Friedrich Richter
 1958 Wilhelm Foerst
 1962 Erich Pietsch
 1965 Jean Baptiste Gillis
 1966 Eduard Kreuzhage
 1973 Werner Schultheis
 1976 Hans Rudolf Christen
 1977 Günter Kresze
 1980 Margot Becke-Goehring
 1981 Fred A. Tate
 1983 Robert Fugmann, Ernst Meyer
 1987 Jürgen Schaafhausen
 1988 Gerd M. Ahrenholz
 1990 Christian Weiske
 1991 Johann Gasteiger
 1995 Christoph Meinel
 2000 Peter Gölitz
 2002 Ursula Schoch-Grübler
 2005 Ute Deichmann
 2007 Olga Kennard
 2010 Jürgen Gmehling
 2012 Engelbert Zaß
 2014 Henning Hopf
 2016 Joe P. Richmond
 2018 René Deplanque
 2020 Guillermo Restrepo

External links

References 

Chemistry awards
Awards established in 1954
German awards